The 2020 ITTF Pan-America Cup was a table tennis competition that took place from 7 to 9 February in Guaynabo, Puerto Rico, organised under the authority of the International Table Tennis Federation (ITTF).

Medalists

Men's singles

Main draw

Women's singles

Main draw

See also

2020 Europe Top 16 Cup
2020 ITTF-ATTU Asian Cup

References

Pan American Table Tennis Cup
Pan-America Cup
ITTF Pan-America Cup
ITTF Pan-America Cup
ITTF Pan-America Cup
ITTF Pan-America Cup